Membrane-spanning 4A genes are members of the CD20-like family. The MS4A genes are usually organized in a single genomic clusters in mammals, suggestive of gene duplication events. MS4A genes encode a class of four-transmembrane spanning proteins. MS4A genes have been described to act as a specific kind of olfactory receptor in the necklace olfactory sensory neurons in mice (Mus musculus).

In human (Homo sapiens) the members of this family include:
 MS4A1 (better known as "CD20")
 MS4A2
 MS4A3
 MS4A4A
 MS4A4E
 MS4A5
 MS4A6A
 MS4A6E
 MS4A7
 MS4A8B
 MS4A9
 MS4A10
 MS4A12
 MS4A13
 MS4A14
 MS4A15
 MS4A18

References 

Gene families